Sheldon Albert Lee (born March 24, 1933) is a former Canadian politician.  He was the Liberal member of Legislative Assembly of New Brunswick for the riding of Charlotte Centre from 1978 to 1995 and then for the new district of Charlotte from 1995 New Brunswick general election until his retirement at the calling of the 2003 election.

References 
 Canadian Parliamentary Guide, 1988, PG Normandin

1933 births
New Brunswick Liberal Association MLAs
Members of the Executive Council of New Brunswick
Canadian Baptists
Living people
21st-century Canadian politicians